Kanjur-e Sofla (also Romanized as Kanjūr-e Soflá; also known as Ganjūr-e Pā’īn, Kanjūr, and Kanjūr-e Pā’īn) is a village in Qarah Su Rural District, in the Central District of Kermanshah County, Kermanshah Province, Iran. At the 2006 census, its population was 298, in 65 families.

References 

Populated places in Kermanshah County